Pir Shah Jurio is an Indus Valley civilization archaeological site located in Sindh, Pakistan. It was discovered by Abdur Rauf Khan. The site is situated at the mouth of Hub river in Karachi district and probably served as an important port.

See also
 Indus Valley civilization
 List of Indus Valley Civilization sites
 List of inventions and discoveries of the Indus Valley Civilization
 Hydraulic engineering of the Indus Valley Civilization

References

Archaeological sites in Sindh
Indus Valley civilisation sites
Former populated places in Pakistan